Thunder Alley is an American sitcom that aired from March 9, 1994 to July 4, 1995, on ABC.

Premise
The show stars Edward Asner as retired race-car driver Gil Jones. The unaired original pilot episode featured Felicity Huffman in the role of Bobbi Turner, Gil's daughter. When ABC picked up the series, Huffman was replaced with Diane Venora. The pilot was reshot and Venora played the role for eight episodes before she was replaced by Robin Riker in the second season, who played the role for the remainder of the series. 

The story involved Bobbi returning to her old hometown, after a divorce to live with her father. In tow were her three children: Claudine (Kelly Vint); Jenny (Lindsay Felton); and Harry (Haley Joel Osment). The new family quintet lived in Gil's home above Thunder Alley, the specialty racing garage Gil operated. Rounding out the cast was Gil's dim-witted mechanic sidekick, Leland DuParte (Jim Beaver). In the show's second season, Andrew Keegan joined the cast as Jack Kelly, a local boy who helped around the garage. The first season was set in Indianapolis, Indiana, followed by Detroit, Michigan in the second season.

Production and broadcast history
Thunder Alley was created and executive produced by Matt Williams, Carmen Finestra and David McFadzean for Wind Dancer Productions and Touchstone Television. The director of a majority of episodes was Robby Benson.

The show debuted to good ratings, finishing its first season the number 12th program with an average household share of 15.9, helped in part by its being paired with the hit Home Improvement, coming from the same producers. However, it struggled in its second season when it was slotted as the lead-off show on Wednesday nights. It was canceled in the spring of 1995.

Cast and characters
Edward Asner as Gil Jones
Diane Venora as Bobbi Turner (season 1)
Robin Riker as Bobbi Turner (season 2)
Kelly Vint as Claudine Turner, Bobbi's eldest daughter
Lindsay Felton as Jenny Turner, Bobbi's second eldest daughter
Haley Joel Osment as Harry Turner, Bobbi's youngest son
Jim Beaver as Leland DuParte
Andrew Keegan as Jack Kelly (season 2)

Episodes

Season 1 (1994)

Season 2 (1994–95)

Awards and nominations

References

External links
 
 

1990s American sitcoms
1994 American television series debuts
1995 American television series endings
American Broadcasting Company original programming
English-language television shows
Home Improvement (TV series)
Television series by ABC Studios
Television shows set in Detroit
Television shows set in Indianapolis